Deirdre Susan Caruana-Farrugia (born 26 October 1972) is a Maltese former sprinter. She competed in the women's 100 metres at the 1992 Summer Olympics.

References

External links
 

1972 births
Living people
Athletes (track and field) at the 1992 Summer Olympics
Maltese female sprinters
Olympic athletes of Malta
World Athletics Championships athletes for Malta
Place of birth missing (living people)
Olympic female sprinters